Eka soup, also known as ekuku, is a delicacy of three tribes in the Eastern region of Nigeria. It is prepared from mashed palm kernel, roasted groundnut and benne seeds. Eka soup is commonly eaten with starchy foods such as fufu.

History 
The soup is common among the people in Benue, Kogi and Cross River State. Beniseed soup is known as  ishwa soup by the Tiv tribe, while Hausa refer to the soup as ridi.

Ingredients 
The dish includes  roasted benne, roasted groundnut, palm kernel, meat, vegetable (bitter leaf, maggi, onions, salt, and crayfish).

Preparation 
Meat is fried in a pan for a few minutes. Roasted benne seed, roasted groundnut and palm kernel mash are blended with the meat.

The blended mixture is then rolled into small balls and cooked in palm oil vegetable (bitter leaf) and other ingredients such as maggi, onion, salt, and crayfish are added.

Similar soups 
Other soups made from nuts and seeds include:

 Banga soup - delicacy of Urhobo people made from palm kernel, it is best eaten with starchy foods.
 Egusi soup - soup made from melon seeds and leaves
 Ogbono soup - cracked bush mango seeds, it is a draw soup eaten with eba, Amala.

Other foods 
Eka soup is often eaten with Eba, pounded yam and fufu.

See also 
Nigerian cuisine
Coconut soup

References 

Fruit soups
Nigerian soups